Vadakkanthara is an area  in Palakkad city, Kerala, India. It is located about 3 km from centre of city.Vadakkanthara is wards 43 and 50 of Palakkad Municipality.

Religious sites

Thirupuraikkal Temple is a historical Hindu temple located in Vadakkanthara.

References

Villages in Palakkad district
 
Suburbs of Palakkad
Cities and towns in Palakkad district